Graeber Crawley Kessinger (born August 25, 1997) is an American professional baseball shortstop in the Houston Astros organization.

Amateur career
Kessinger attended Oxford High School in Oxford, Mississippi. He was drafted out of high school in the 2016 MLB draft, going in the 26th Round to the San Diego Padres, however he put his professional career on hold to attend the University of Mississippi to play college baseball for the Ole Miss Rebels. 

As a freshman at Ole Miss in 2017, Kessinger batted only .175 with two home runs and 16 runs batted in (RBIs). In his sophomore year at Ole Miss, Kessinger improved to hit .300 with 8 home runs and 37 RBIs. After the 2018 season, he briefly played collegiate summer baseball with the Bourne Braves of the Cape Cod Baseball League. In Kessinger's junior and final year at Ole Miss, he hit .330 with seven home runs and 50 RBIs. In his junior year at Ole Miss he was named First Team All-SEC shortstop, a Third Team All-American by Collegiate Baseball, and named to ABCA All-South Region First Team. He was also awarded the Brooks Wallace Award, given annually to the nation's top shortstop.

Professional career
The Houston Astros selected Kessinger in the second round of the 2019 Major League Baseball draft. Kessinger made his Minor League Baseball debut with the Tri-City ValleyCats on June 20, 2019, and had his first professional hit in the game. Kessinger was called up to Class A on July 4, 2019, to play for the Quad Cities River Bandits.

After the 2020 Minor League season was canceled, Kessinger began the 2021 season with the Double-A Corpus Christi Hooks. Over 86 games, he slashed .209/.287/.330 with nine home runs, 26 RBIs, and 12 stolen bases.

Personal life
Kessinger's grandfather, Don Kessinger, played shortstop and managed in Major League baseball (MLB). His uncle, Keith Kessinger, played at shortstop in MLB in 1993 and coached in college baseball.

References

External links

1997 births
Living people
Sportspeople from Oxford, Mississippi
Baseball players from Mississippi
Baseball shortstops
Ole Miss Rebels baseball players
Bourne Braves players
Tri-City ValleyCats players
Quad Cities River Bandits players
Corpus Christi Hooks players